Lake View is a city in Sac County, Iowa, United States. The population was 1,113 in the 2020 census, a decline from the 1,278 population in 2000.

History
The area around what is today called Black Hawk Lake was settled by white settlers in 1867. The first settlement was built by Robert Throssel and his son, followed by Joseph Parkinson, Noah Borah, William Johnston, Thomas Waddicor and George Trainer.  In 1880 Platt Armstrong and James Fletcher built a railway station for the North Western Railway Company and laid out the town of Fletcher. The town was incorporated as a city and the name was changed from Fletcher to Lake View in 1887. The present name was selected for the scenic view over Wall Lake.

Geography
Lake View is located at  (42.307049, -95.047394).

Demographics

2010 census
As of the census of 2010, there were 1,142 people, 564 households, and 326 families residing in the city. The racial makeup of the city was 99.3% White, 0.3% African American, 0.1% Pacific Islander, and 0.4% from two or more races. Hispanic or Latino of any race were 0.1% of the population.

There were 564 households, of which 17.7% had children under the age of 18 living with them, 48.2% were married couples living together, 6.2% had a female householder with no husband present, 3.4% had a male householder with no wife present, and 42.2% were non-families. 38.8% of all households were made up of individuals, and 20.9% had someone living alone who was 65 years of age or older. The average household size was 1.95 and the average family size was 2.54.

The median age in the city was 54.3 years. 16.1% of residents were under the age of 18; 3.5% were between the ages of 18 and 24; 16.7% were from 25 to 44; 33.3% were from 45 to 64; and 30.5% were 65 years of age or older. The gender makeup of the city was 47.2% male and 52.8% female.

2000 census
As of the census of 2000, there were 1,278 people, 571 households, and 360 families residing in the city. The racial makeup of the city was 99.06% White, 0.39% African American, 0.08% Native American, and 0.47% from two or more races. Hispanic or Latino of any race were 0.23% of the population.

There were 571 households, out of which 22.9% had children under the age of 18 living with them, 54.6% were married couples living together, 7.4% had a female householder with no husband present, and 36.8% were non-families. 33.1% of all households were made up of individuals, and 19.1% had someone living alone who was 65 years of age or older. The average household size was 2.18 and the average family size was 2.75.

In the city, the population was spread out, with 20.7% under the age of 18, 4.4% from 18 to 24, 19.7% from 25 to 44, 26.5% from 45 to 64, and 28.7% who were 65 years of age or older. The median age was 48 years. For every 100 females, there were 87.9 males. For every 100 females age 18 and over, there were 81.1 males.

The median income for a household in the city was $26,691, and the median income for a family was $33,333. Males had a median income of $26,932 versus $19,773 for females. The per capita income for the city was $15,857. About 9.5% of families and 13.3% of the population were below the poverty line, including 24.0% of those under age 18 and 8.5% of those age 65 or over.

Parks and recreation
The Sauk Rail Trail is a 33-mile trail running between the Black Hawk Lake in Lake View and Swan Lake in Carroll. It runs through several parks and the communities of Carnarvon, Breda and Maple River Junction. The multi-purpose recreational trail provides an outdoor recreational experience for the public, preserves a varied habitat for wildlife and preserving native vegetation.

Education
The city is served by the East Sac County Community School District. It was a part of the Lake View-Auburn Community School District until July 1, 1996, when it merged into the Wall Lake View Auburn School District. That in turn merged into East Sac County on July 1, 2011.

Lake View has one school, the high school for the district.  The elementary school is located in Sac City, and the middle school is also in Sac City.  It was formerly the combined high school and middle school for the Wall Lake View Auburn School District.  The school's mascot is a Viking-inspired "Raider".  The superintendent is Jeff Kruse.  The principal of the high school is Kevin Litterer.

See also

A list of National Register of Historic Places in Lake View

References

External links

Official City Website
East Sac County Schools Website
City-Data Comprehensive statistical data and more about Lake View

Cities in Iowa
Cities in Sac County, Iowa